, literally meaning "house name", is a term applied in traditional Japanese culture to names passed down within a guild, studio, or other circumstance other than blood relations. The term most often refers to the guild names of kabuki actors, but is also applicable to the names artists take from their masters or studios, names taken from one's business, and a few other similar circumstances.

A number of  have associated  emblems, some of which incorporate rebuses; see Japanese rebus monogram.

History
Originally,  were place names of homes or buildings taken on by the inhabitants. Even when the house changed hands entirely from one family to another, the new family would take on the name of the house. However, the previous owners would frequently keep the house name when they moved. Often, a family (or individual) would come to be better known by their  than by their actual family name.

Though it is not clear when the custom first emerged, it first appears in print in the chronicles of the Muromachi period. For many centuries, commoners in Japan did not have family names, and so  would often come about to describe people by their location, occupation, or by a store or business they owned. There are similarities in the origins and evolution of family names in other cultures around the world.

 also came to be used to help differentiate the status of lineages with the same last name, or simply to differentiate between people with the same family name within a village.

 came to be especially well-known and widely used in kabuki theater, where actors take on a name relating to their guild. This therefore connects him to others of the Naritaya, and reflects his apprenticeship and study alongside certain other actors who might be from other families. Actors'  were often chosen to recall earlier great actors, and it remains a common practice (called ) for audience members to shout out an actor's  when he performed a line or pose particularly well-executed, especially a pose or line associated with the actor's namesake.

Artists, writers and poets in Japan, like in other parts of the world, would often take on pen names or pseudonyms. These were sometimes derived from the names of their mentors (particularly in painting studios), in which case they could be considered . More often, these art-names or pen names are called , or simply , in Japanese.

During the Edo period, merchant houses took , which functioned as surnames. Some of these survive as surnames today.

References

Bibliography
"yagō". (1985). Kodansha Encyclopedia of Japan. Tokyo: Kodansha Ltd.

Japanese family structure
Naming conventions
Japanese words and phrases